Hit FM or Hits FM may refer to any of the following radio stations:

Hit FM
 HIT FM Denmark
 Hit FM (Russia)
 Hit FM (Taiwan)
 99.5 Hit FM, now DWRT-FM, in the Philippines

Hits FM
 Hits FM (Madrid), in Spain
 Hits FM (Nepal)